Baum und Pferdgarten is a Danish fashion house.

Rikke Baumgarten and Helle Hestehave began designing their collections as newly graduated designers in the part of Copenhagen called Nørrebro. Today their office is situated in Vognmagergade in central Copenhagen, which is also the location of the Baum und Pferdgarten flagship store which opened in February 2010. The interior of the shop was created by the designers together with, amongst others “Femmes Regionales” and “all the way to paris”.

Currently Baum und Pferdgarten is available in more than 20 countries worldwide.

In 2009 the company experienced economical difficulties but survived due to the investment of Bruuns Bazaar A/S who became majority shareholder.

References

External links
 Bruuns Bazaar
 DANSK Fashion Awards
 The Golden Fur Pin

Clothing companies of Denmark
Clothing brands of Denmark
Clothing companies based in Copenhagen
Companies based in Copenhagen Municipality
Danish companies established in 1999
Clothing companies established in 1999